David Thomas Watson (born 24 May 1966) is a New Zealand former rugby league footballer who represented New Zealand in the 1980s and 1990s.

Playing career
Watson began his career playing for the Waitara Bears in the Taranaki Rugby League before moving north and playing in the Auckland Rugby League competition. Watson joined the Manukau Magpies and in 1986 won the ARLs most improved back award.

In 1990 he signed with Hull Kingston Rovers for the 1990/91 season. He returned to England the next winter to play for the Halifax.  In 1992 he began an association with Bradford Northern that lasted three seasons. Dave Watson played  in Bradford Northern's 15-8 defeat by Wigan in the 1992–93 Regal Trophy Final during the 1992–93 season at Elland Road, Leeds on Saturday 23 January 1993.

In 1993 Watson returned to Taranaki and played in the North Island Second Division. This made him eligible to participate in the Kiwi trials that year and he was selected for the series against Australia.

In 1994 Watson began playing in the Australian competition, spending time with the Cronulla Sharks, Sydney Tigers, Gold Coast Chargers and South Queensland Crushers.

In 1998 he returned to England, joining the Sheffield Eagles. In 1998 Watson, along with fellow 1989 Kiwi Whetu Taewa, Watson played  in Sheffield Eagles' 17-8 victory over Wigan in the 1998 Challenge Cup Final during Super League III at Wembley Stadium, London on Saturday 2 May 1998.

Representative career
Watson was a Taranaki and Auckland representative before being selected to represent New Zealand Māori in the 1986 Pacific Cup. He again represented the Māori against Great Britain in 1990.

Watson was selected for the New Zealand national rugby league team in 1989. He went on to make 15 appearances for the Kiwis, his last being in the 1993 test series against Australia.

Legacy
In 2008 he was named in the Taranaki Rugby League Team of the Century.

References

1966 births
Living people
Auckland rugby league team players
Balmain Tigers players
Bradford Bulls players
Cronulla-Sutherland Sharks players
Gold Coast Chargers players
Halifax R.L.F.C. players
Hull Kingston Rovers players
Manukau Magpies players
New Zealand Māori rugby league players
New Zealand Māori rugby league team players
New Zealand national rugby league team players
New Zealand rugby league players
Rochdale Hornets players
Rugby league centres
Rugby league five-eighths
Rugby league fullbacks
Rugby league players from Taranaki
Sheffield Eagles (1984) players
South Queensland Crushers players
Taranaki rugby league team players
Waitara Bears players
Whitehaven R.L.F.C. players
Workington Town players
York Wasps players